"The Defector" is the tenth episode of the third season of the American science fiction television series Star Trek: The Next Generation, and the 58th episode of the series overall.

Set in the 24th century, the series follows the adventures of the Starfleet crew of the Federation starship Enterprise-D.  In this episode, a Romulan defector requests asylum aboard the Enterprise after claiming to possess vital information about an imminent Romulan invasion.

Plot
The episode begins with Data exploring the human condition through acting in a Shakespearean play, Henry V. Captain Picard is giving Data some constructive criticism when he is notified by Commander Riker that a Romulan scout vessel is being pursued in the Neutral Zone. The scout vessel is under attack by a Romulan warbird, and they are approaching Federation space. The Enterprise moves to intercept the ship, causing the Warbird to cloak and return to Romulan space. The occupant of the ship is brought aboard the Enterprise, and claims he is Sub-Lieutenant Setal, an insignificant logistics clerk seeking to defect to the Federation after coming across information about a secret Romulan installation on the planet Nelvana III, within the Neutral Zone, that could sustain a large Romulan fleet.

Picard and his crew are skeptical of Setal's claims after he refuses to provide evidence, and Picard orders an investigation of Setal's reliability while the Federation relays to the Enterprise the Romulans are seeking Setal's return. After Setal's ship auto-destructs, the crew review the records of Setal's arrival, and believe the Romulans arranged Setal as part of an elaborate hoax. Picard refuses to enter the Neutral Zone on the baseless claims.

Setal confides to Data his defection came at a heavy price, he will never see Romulus or his family; Data attempts to alleviate Setal's feelings by taking him to a holodeck representation of Romulus. Setal dismisses the hologram, then reveals he is Admiral Jarok, a high-ranking officer who led a vicious campaign against several Federation outposts near the Neutral Zone. Jarok again beseeches Picard to investigate Nelvana III, but Picard refuses, and demands either Jarok provide information or he will be deemed a traitor. Jarok gives in to Picard's request, and gives detailed tactical information to Picard. Picard orders the Enterprise to Nelvana III.

After they arrive, the crew find the planet barren with no evidence of any installation, to Jarok's surprise. Unexpectedly, two Romulan warbirds de-cloak and fire upon the Enterprise. Picard realizes Jarok was used as a pawn by the Romulans, feeding him disinformation to lure the Federation into the Neutral Zone while disgracing Jarok. In response to Romulan commander Tomalak's demand for the Enterprises surrender, Picard reveals he prepared for this: at his command, three Birds-of-Prey, sent by the Klingon Empire at Picard's request (as relayed by Worf), decloak and surround the warbirds, rendering the situation a stalemate. The Romulans re-cloak and retreat, allowing the Enterprise to leave. After the Enterprise left the Neutral Zone, the crew discover Jarok committed suicide... leaving behind a note for his family. While Data notes relations with the Empire make delivery of the letter impossible, Picard states 'as long as there are Romulans with Admiral Jarok's courage and conviction, it may, one day, be possible to deliver Jarok's letter home'.

Notes
 In addition to his regular role of Captain Picard, Patrick Stewart also played the role of the holodeck character of "Michael Williams" from Shakespeare's Henry V, Act 4, Scene I, in the opening scenes of the episode. Stewart, who performed the role under heavy prosthetic makeup, requested this out of his love for Shakespeare—Stewart is a member of the Royal Shakespeare Company. Stewart uses a regional English accent from the Black Country, an area between Birmingham and Wolverhampton; his version is of the strong 'Gornal' variety of Black Country dialect.
 This is the second episode written by Ronald D. Moore; the episode earned him a position on the show's writing staff. Moore would have a long association with Star Trek, staying with Star Trek: The Next Generation through its final season, then moving to Star Trek: Deep Space Nine; he became a co-executive producer. Moore co-wrote the first two feature films based on The Next Generation, Star Trek Generations and Star Trek: First Contact.
 The planet Nelvana III is named after the popular Canadian animation studio Nelvana.

Releases
On June 6, 1995 "The Defector" was released with "Vengeance Factor" on LaserDisc in the United States by Paramount Home Video, and in Japan on July 5, 1996, in the half season set Log. 5: Third Season Part.1 by CIC Video. This included episodes up to  "A Matter of Perspective" on 12-inch double sided optical discs. The video was in NTSC format with both English and Japanese audio tracks.

The episode was released with Star Trek: The Next Generation season three DVD box set, released in the United States on July 2, 2002. This had 26 episodes of Season 3 on seven discs, with a Dolby Digital 5.1 audio track. It was released in high-definition Blu-ray in the United States on April 30, 2013.

Reception 
In 2019, Screen Rant ranked this episode's character introduction, Admiral Jarok, as the tenth most important Romulan of the Star Trek Franchise. Later that year, they noted "The Defector" as one of the top ten important episodes to watch in preparation for the series Star Trek: Picard. In 2020, SyFy also recommended watching "The Defector", in this case as background on Romulan aliens for Star Trek: Picard. They note the episode highlights the layers of trust and mistrust between the forces at work in the Romulan Star Empire, and how this complicated its relations with other quadrant inhabitants.

In 2020, Vulture.com recommended this episode to accompany viewing Star Trek: Picard, noting how it establishes the Romulan alien's lust for power and tendency for deception.

References

 Star Trek The Next Generation DVD set, volume 3, disc 3, selection 2.

External links
 

 "The Defector" rewatch by Keith R.A. DeCandido
 "The Defector" rewatch by Zack Handlen of The A.V. Club

Star Trek: The Next Generation (season 3) episodes
1990 American television episodes
Television episodes written by Ronald D. Moore
Television episode directed by Robert Scheerer